Jorjafk (also Romanized as Jorjāfk; also known as Jorjānak) is a village in Jorjafk Rural District, in the Central District of Zarand County, Kerman Province, Iran. In 2006, its population was 772, in 216 families.

References 

Populated places in Zarand County